Bhairab is a upazila of Kishoreganj District in the Division of Dhaka, Bangladesh. Joanshahi was another name of Bhairab. The city centre of this upazila is Bhairab Bazaar.  About 118,992 people live in Bhairab municipality which makes this city the largest in Kishoreganj District and 28th largest city in Bangladesh.

Geography
It has 34,419 households and total area is 139.32 km2. Bhairab is situated beside the rivers of Meghna and  Brahmaputra. Bhairab Bazar (town) is notable for the Bhairab railway station and the railway bridge, Bhairab bridge that goes over the river of Meghna.

Demographics
As of the 2011 Bangladesh census, Bhairab has a population of 298309. 115498 of total population live in Municipality area. Males constitute 49.25% of the population, and females 50.74%. This Upazila's eighteen up population is 95,910. According  to the 1991 Bangladesh census, Bhairab has an average literacy rate of 36.23% (7+ years) where the national average is 32.4%.

Administration
Bhairab was declared as a Thana in 1906. Later, the thana was turned into present-day Bhairab Upazila in 1983.

Bhairab Upazila is divided into Bhairab Municipality and seven union parishads: Aganagar, Gazaria, Kalika Prashad, Sadakpur, Shibpur, Shimulkandi, and Sreenagar. The union parishads are subdivided into 32 mauzas and 84 villages.

Bhairab Municipality is subdivided into 12 wards and 29 mahallas.

Education

There are five colleges in the Upazila. They include three honors-level ones: Government Zillur Rahman Mohila College, Hazi Asmat College, founded in 1947, and Rafiqul Islam Girls' College (1987), Shahidullah Kaiser College (2010).

There isonly one Govt. School and College – Bhairab Technical School and College(1965)  to produce skilled manpower for contribution on development of national production the then-Government in 1965 established 51 Vocational Training Institutes in the whole country. With the modernization and reorganization of the vocational education system SSC (Vocational) and HSC (Vocational) program was started in 1995. To ensure the social acceptance and dignity of vocational graduates the institute is renamed as Bhairab Technical School and College by a gazette notification from Ministry of Education, Bangladesh. There are 64 Government Educational Institutes of this category which are introducing the Vocational Education in HSC level and Bhairab Technical School and College is only the institute in the district which is offering SSC (Vocational) and HSC (Vocational) course with well-equipped laboratories, multimedia classroom facilities and highly qualified and experienced teachers. Nowadays this institute also started Diploma Course (offering two Department Electrical Engineering and Mechanical Engineering). There is currently a government school.

According to Banglapedia, Bhairab K. B. Pilot Model High School, founded in 1919, Bangladesh Railway High School, Bhairab (1954), Shahidullah Kaiser High School, Banshgari (2014), Saint Kayzer Education Home, Banshgari (2014), Kamalpur Hazi Zahir Uddin High School, Srinagar High School (1961), Bhairab M. P. Pilot Girls' High School (1962), and Kalika Prasad High School (1964), Shimul Kandi High School (1970)  Sadek Pur High School (1973) are notable secondary schools.

The madrasa education system includes one fazil madrasa.

Municipal City
Bhairab Bazaar is the urban centre of this upazila. It hosts one of the important port of Bangladesh. It is a well known business zone of Dhaka Division. Though it is a small city, it has a large measure of population. Almost 15,000 people per square kilometer live in this municipal city. Bhairab is mostly known for its port and fishes. It is a first class municipal city. Bhairab bridge connects Dhaka and Chattogram Divisions of Bangladesh. It is the second-largest Bridge of Bangladesh after Hardinge Bridge. Besides, Bhairab has two other important bridges Syed Nazrul Islam Bridge and Zillur Rahman Railway Bridge.
 Bhairabpur
 New Town
 Chandiber
 Bhairab Bazar
 Komolpur
 Amlapara
 Ghorakanda
 Tatarkandi
 Kalipur
 Sadekpur

Notable residents
 Zillur Rahman, President of Bangladesh (2009-2013), was born in Bhairab in 1929.
 Ivy Rahman, prominent politician, was born in Bhairab on 7 July 1934
 Nazmul Hassan Papon, President of Bangladesh Cricket Board

See also
Upazilas of Bangladesh
Districts of Bangladesh
Divisions of Bangladesh

References

Upazilas of Kishoreganj District